Jacoby Windmon is an American college football defensive end for the Michigan State Spartans. He previously played for the UNLV Rebels.

Early life and high school career
Windmon grew up in New Orleans, Louisiana and attended John Ehret High School. He was rated a three-star recruit and committed to play college football at UNLV over offers from South Alabama and Tulane.

College career
Windmon began his college career at UNLV. He joined the team as an early enrollee and expected to play tight end before being moved to defensive end and playing in all 12 games of the Rebels games. Windmon was named honorable mention All-Mountain West Conference as a sophomore after recording 39 tackles with two passes broken up and one forced fumble. He was named second-team All-Mountain West after leading UNLV with 118 tackles, 11 tackles for loss, and 6.5 sacks during his junior season. After the end of the season, Windmon entered the NCAA transfer portal.

Windmon ultimately transferred to Michigan State. He was named a starter at defensive end entering his first season with the team.

References

External links
UNLV Rebels bio
Michigan State Spartans bio

Living people
Players of American football from Louisiana
American football defensive ends
Michigan State Spartans football players
UNLV Rebels football players
Year of birth missing (living people)